Zayanderud Dam, also spelled Zayandeh Rud Dam formerly known as the Shah Abbas Dam, is an arch dam on the Zayandeh River about  east of Chadegan, Iran. It also supports a power station with an installed capacity of 55 MW.

See also

List of power stations in Iran

References

Hydroelectric power stations in Iran
Arch dams
Dams completed in 1971
1971 establishments in Iran
Energy infrastructure completed in 1971
Tourist attractions in Chaharmahal and Bakhtiari Province